Wayne Frederick Stephenson (January 29, 1945 – June 22, 2010) was a Canadian professional ice hockey goaltender. He was born in Fort William, Ontario.

Playing career
Stephenson played primarily with the Canadian National Team early in his career, and was a member of the 1968 Canadian Olympic Hockey Team that won the Bronze Medal.

Stephenson graduated from the University of Winnipeg with an economics degree and worked as an accountant.  After he retired from professional hockey, he worked in the banking industry.

His NHL career would begin in 1971 when he was signed as a free agent by the St. Louis Blues.  After three seasons with the Blues, he was traded to the Philadelphia Flyers.  While in Philadelphia, Wayne toiled as a backup to Bernie Parent for the 1974-1975 season.  When Parent suffered a pinched nerve in his neck during the 1975-1976 pre season that required surgery, Stephenson became the Flyers starting goaltender and retained the job when Parent returned late in the season but couldn't regain his previous All Star form.  During that year, Stephenson allowed one goal in the Flyers' win over the Soviet Red Army hockey team, a victory Stephenson referred to as the highlight of his career.  Stephenson sought a salary increase to reflect his new responsibilities and value to the team in 1976 but management held firm and he returned to the Philadelphia lineup after a two-month holdout.  The friction generated by the dispute fueled his exit from Philadelphia.  Stephenson was traded to the Washington Capitals prior to the 1979–80 NHL season and played there for two seasons before retiring.

Stephenson died from brain cancer.  He was married for 39 years to his wife Nedina and had four children, two sons and two daughters.

Awards and achievements 
MJHL First All-Star Team (1965)
MJHL Top Goaltender (1965)
MJHL Most Valuable Player (1965)
Turnbull Cup MJHL Championship (1965)
Played in the World Championships for Team Canada (1967 and 1969)
Olympic bronze medalist (1968)
Stanley Cup championship (1975)
Played in NHL All-Star Game (1976 and 1978)
"Honoured Member" of the Manitoba Hockey Hall of Fame

Career statistics

Regular season and playoffs

International

References

External links
 
Remembering Stephenson at IIHF.com
Wayne Stephenson's biography at Manitoba Hockey Hall of Fame
Wayne Stephenson's biography at Hockey Goalies
Wayne Stephenson's obituary

1945 births
2010 deaths
Canadian ice hockey goaltenders
Edmonton Oil Kings (WCHL) players
Ice hockey people from Ontario
Sportspeople from Thunder Bay
Ice hockey players at the 1968 Winter Olympics
Kansas City Blues players
National Hockey League All-Stars
Olympic bronze medalists for Canada
Olympic ice hockey players of Canada
Olympic medalists in ice hockey
Philadelphia Flyers players
St. Louis Blues players
Stanley Cup champions
Washington Capitals players
Winnipeg Braves players
Medalists at the 1968 Winter Olympics